KVTE-LD, virtual and UHF digital channel 35, is a low-powered GetTV-affiliated television station licensed to Las Vegas, Nevada, United States. The station is owned by Mountain Ridge Holdings.

The station has been silent since October 2013.

History
On April 15, 1994, application JF0415CY was filed with the Federal Communications Commission. It was first granted a license to operate as K61GV channel 61 on April 15, 1996. On July 28, 1999, the station moved to its current frequency and changed its call-letters to K35FN, then changed callsigns to KYRK-LP on November 5, 1999. The station then changed its callsign to KVTE-LP on June 17, 2005. It gained its current callsign of KVTE-LD on July 12, 2018.

Robin Leach became affiliated with KVTE in late 2004, and by March 2005, had filed a lawsuit against owner Nathan Drage claiming, among other things, fraud against the corporation. Ultimately over a year later, in May 2006, Leach dismissed his lawsuit and claimed it was all a misunderstanding and that the allegations of fraud were the result of a miscommunication between Leach and his legal counsel.

After Leach's departure the station produced a completely different show line-up of all original programming geared towards a national and international audience for what it called the Las Vegas Television Network. By June 1, 2010, however, the station was airing color bars and tone and had filed for a silent Special Temporary Authority with the Federal Communications Commission. It has been silent since.

References

External links

 Las Vegas Television Network

VTE-LD
Television channels and stations established in 1999
1999 establishments in Nevada
Low-power television stations in the United States